The Westin Nanea Ocean Villas is a hotel resort in Kaanapali, Hawaii. It is located on the western side of the island of Maui. Opened in April 2017, the hotel consists eight six-story buildings, with one-, two- and three-bedroom villas. The resort is located adjacent to the Westin Ka'anapali Ocean Resort Villas.

References 

2017 establishments in Hawaii
Hotel buildings completed in 2017
Condo hotels in the United States
Hotels established in 2017
Resorts in Hawaii